Anne Firor Scott (April 24, 1921 – February 5, 2019) was an American historian, specializing in the history of women and of the South.

Early life and education
Scott was born April 24, 1921, in Montezuma, Georgia. In 1941 she graduated summa cum laude and Phi Beta Kappa from the University of Georgia. She then worked for the National League of Women Voters in Washington, D.C. She earned a master's degree in political science from Northwestern University in 1944. She married Andrew MacKay Scott in 1947. She then began her doctoral studies at Radcliffe College, Harvard University, while raising their children, a daughter and two sons.

Academic career
She received her PhD in 1949. She had temporary teaching appointments at Haverford College and the University of North Carolina at Chapel Hill, and in 1961 became assistant professor of history at Duke University. In 1980 Firor Scott became the first female chair of Duke's history department. She worked at Duke for the next three decades, until her retirement in 1991. In 1965, President Lyndon Johnson appointed her to the Citizens Advisory Council on the Status of Women. Firor Scott was named the W. K. Boyd Professor Emerita of History at Duke University, as well as an editor of the American Women's History Series at the University of Illinois Press and an editor for UPA.

In 1970, her book The Southern Lady: From Pedestal to Politics, 1830–1930, was published; it is now considered a classic that almost singlehandedly created the modern field of Southern women's history.

In 1984, she became president of the Organization of American Historians. In 1987, the Anne Firor Scott Research Fund was created as an endowment to support students conducting independent research in women's history. In 1989 she became president of the Southern Historical Association. The Women's Studies living group at Duke named their dormitory after her. Since 1992 the Organization of American Historians has awarded the annual Lerner-Scott Prize, named for her and historian Gerda Lerner, to the writer each year of the best doctoral dissertation in U.S. women's history. In 2002 Firor Scott received the Organization of American Historians' Distinguished Service Award. She received the American Historical Association’s Scholarly Achievement Award in 2008.

Scott has also served on the advisory boards of the Schlesinger Library, the Princeton University department of history, and the Woodrow Wilson International Center for Scholars.

Legacy
The Anne Firor Scott papers, 1963–2002, are held at Duke University. Visible Women: New Essays on American Activism, a collection of essays drawing inspiration from Scott's 1984 work, Making the Invisible Woman Visible was published in 1993. Writing Women's History: A Tribute to Anne Firor Scott was published in 2011. It contains essays on how women's history is written in the wake of Scott's book The Southern Lady: From Pedestal to Politics, 1830–1930. Edited by Elizabeth Anne Payne, the collection has contributions from Scott herself, Laura F. Edwards, Crystal Feimster, Glenda E. Gilmore, Jacquelyn Dowd Hall, Darlene Clark Hine, Mary Kelley, Markeeva Morgan, Laurel Thatcher Ulrich, and Deborah Gray White. It is based on papers presented at the University of Mississippi's annual Chancellor Porter L. Fortune Symposium in Southern History.

Bibliography
 The Southern Lady: From Pedestal to Politics, 1830–1930 (1970)
 Women in American Life (1970)
 The American woman: who was she? (Eyewitness accounts of American history series) (1971)
 One Half the People: The Fight for Woman Suffrage (with Andrew M. Scott) (1975)
 What, then, is the American; this new woman? (1978)
 Women in American History : a Bibliography (Scott only wrote the introduction; the editor is Cynthia E. Harrison) (1979)
 Making the Invisible Woman Visible (1984)
“Women in the South,” with Jacquelyn Dowd Hall in Interpreting Southern History: Historiographical Essays in Honor of Sanford W. Higginbotham, ed. John B. Boles and Evelyn T. Nolen (Baton Rouge, 1987), 454–509.
 Foreword, When the World Ended: The Diary of Emma LeConte (Earl Schenck Miers is the editor and Emma LeConte is the author) (1987)
 Virginia Women: The First Two Hundred Years (with Suzanne Lebsock) (1988)
 Natural Allies: Women's Associations in American History (1992)
 Foreword, The Hard-Boiled Virgin (Frances Newman is the author of the book) (1993)
 Unheard Voices: The First Historians of Southern Women (1993)
 Introduction, Women's Life and Work in the Southern Colonies (Author is Julia Cherry Spruill) (1998)
 Introduction, Votes for Women: A 75th Anniversary Album (Authors are Ellen DuBois and Karen Kearns) (1999)
 Southern Women and Their Families in the 19th Century Papers and Diaries Microform (Research Collections in Women's Studies) (Anne Firor Scott, Daniel Lewis, and Martin Paul Schipper were editors; authors are University Publications of America and University of Texas at Austin Center for American History) (2000)
 The Road to Seneca Falls: Elizabeth Cady Stanton and the First Woman's Rights Convention (author is Judith Wellman; Anne Firor Scott and Nancy Hewitt were editors) (Women in American History Series) (2005)
 Pauli Murray and Caroline Ware: Forty Years of Letters in Black and White (2006)
 Lucy Somerville Howorth: New Deal Lawyer, Politician, and Feminist from the South (with Dorothy S. Shawhan and Martha H. Swain) (2011)
 Preface, Never Ask Permission: Elisabeth Scott Bocock of Richmond, A Memoir by Mary Buford Hitz (Author is Mary Buford Hitz) (2012)

Honors
Honorary degrees from Queens College, Northwestern University, Radcliffe College, and the University of the South
Berkshire Conference Prize in 1980
University Medal from Duke University in 1994
Organization of American Historians' Distinguished Service Award in 2002
Fellow of the American Academy of Arts and Sciences in 2004.
American Historical Association’s Scholarly Achievement Award in 2008
2013 National Humanities Medal (awarded in 2014)

References

1921 births
2019 deaths
Feminist historians
Historians of the United States
21st-century American historians
University of Georgia alumni
Northwestern University alumni
Fellows of the American Academy of Arts and Sciences
Haverford College faculty
University of North Carolina at Chapel Hill faculty
Duke University faculty
American women historians
Women's historians
People from Montezuma, Georgia
Radcliffe College alumni
National Humanities Medal recipients
21st-century American women writers
Historians from Georgia (U.S. state)